Dhiego is a rare variant of the popular given name Diego. Notable people with the name include:
Dhiego Lima (born 1989), Brazilian mixed martial artist
Dhiego Martins (born 1988), Brazilian footballer

Masculine given names